Crime Time is a series of animated shorts produced by Future Thought Productions, produced by Jay Zaveri and Steve Kasper, directed by Nassos Vakalis

Premise 
Shifty (The Criminal) perpetrates crimes from the sublime to the ridiculous - and never quite pulls them off, resulting in hilarious consequences. It is rendered in a graphic style reminiscent of classic UPA shorts.

Crime Time gives the viewer a brief but comical look at the irony of crime. Taking on the spirit of old-world cartoons, the series uses sight gags and pacing to bring about a comedic scenario. Produced in a combination of Flash and CGI animation, the creators utilize classic elements of story telling to give this series a unique personality. The series, which consists of shorts varying in length from 90 to 180 seconds, introduces a comic anti-hero character Shifty (The Criminal) who seems to always be just moments away from successfully beating the system only to have his plans derailed by some unforeseeable circumstance.

Characters
Shifty– The Show's main villain protagonist in the series.

The Fat Cop- A unnamed overweight police officer. He partners up with The Skinny Cop.

Lance the Skinny Cop- A thin police officer and the partner of The Fat Cop.

Female Robber- A Female Robber who is Shifty's one time Girlfriend who only appears in The Girlfriend episode.

Episodes 
 Electro-Phobia
 The Bank Robbery
 Paint Job
 Statue
 The Getaway
 The Painting
 Under Control
 The Gift
 The Car Robbery
 Laundry
 Night Job
 Parking Meter
 The Treasure
 Masked Ball
 Midnight Lover
 Tracer
 The Red Dye
 Drive Thru
 Wish Pond
 Subway
 Gooooal
 Cleaning up
 Monkey Business
 Sleepwalker
 Lost Cat
 Vending Machine
 Cruiseship
 Fitting Room
 No Strings Attached
 Way Out West
 At the Movies
 Pharaohs Revenge
 Going Batty
 Grin and Bear It!
 All That Glitters is Gold
 At The Circus
 The Hiker
 The Black Pearl
 The Baby
 The Genie
 The Barber
 The Bridge
 The Birthday Cake
 The Transport
 The Buffet
 The Dollar Bill
 The Musician
 Minus Zero
 The Golden Nugget
 Tips
 The Paparazzi
 The Party
 Shifty the Cyclist
 The Horse Race
 The Diver
 UP, Up and Away
 Bum Steer
 Shifty Skywalker
 The Masked Destroyer
 I Smell a Rat
 Pizza
 The Camper
 Public Restrooms
 The Dog Walker
 The Great Jump
 Gopher Broke
 A Clean Sweep
 Spaced Out
 Backyard Trouble
 Easy Come Easy Go
 The Fur Coats
 Gardening
 The Hitch Hiker
 The Mountain Climber
 The Valet
 The Spa Treatment
 Slope, Slope
 The Funeral
 The Map
 The Talented Ant
 The ATM
 The Scrap Metal
 Car Racing
 Snap Shot
 The Jackpot
 The Hypnotist
 The Pilot
 The Bus Driver
 Area 51
 The Jeweler
 The Chariot Driver
 The Girlfriend
 Halloween Ghosts
 Hot Air
 Ancestors
 A Knights Tale
 Oils Well that Ends Well
 Rodeo Show
 A Looney Tribute
 Private Property
 Monster Truck
 Window Washer
 Royal Jewels
 The Clean Getaway
 The Break In
 First Impressions
 Robin Hoodwinked
 The Dummy
 Mans Best Friend
 Out of Sight
 One Hell of a Day
 Spooked
 Batteries not Included
 The Pirate
 The Fall Guy
 The Prize
 The Airport
 Have a Blast
 Sweet Dreams

See also
List of Indian animated television series
Chimpoo Simpoo
Chorr Police
Sammy (TV series)

References

External links
 Crime Time at IMDb

Cartoon Network (Indian TV channel) original programming
Indian flash animated television series
2008 Indian television series debuts
Indian children's animated comedy television series
2000s Indian television miniseries
British flash animated television series